Christopher Smith (died 20 January 1835) was a London merchant, a Lord Mayor of London and Member of Parliament.

Life 
He was born the son of a farmer near Abingdon-on-Thames, then in Berkshire. Having gone up to London to be inoculated against smallpox, he found himself working for a wine merchant who left him the business on his death. Smith's own sons were to continue the business after his own demise.

As a member of the Draper's Company he became London councilman in 1800 and in 1807 was raised to the honour of Aldermen, a rank he held until his death. He was elected a Sheriff of London for 1807–08 and Lord Mayor of London for 1817–18. He was President of St Thomas' Hospital from 1818 to his death.

In 1812 he was elected Member of Parliament (MP) for St Albans, holding the seat until 1818. After being defeated in the election of that year, he was re-elected to the seat in 1820, sitting until 1830.

He married twice and had two sons.

References

|-

1835 deaths
Year of birth uncertain
People from Abingdon-on-Thames
English merchants
19th-century lord mayors of London
19th-century English politicians
18th-century English politicians
Members of the Parliament of the United Kingdom for English constituencies
UK MPs 1812–1818
UK MPs 1820–1826
UK MPs 1826–1830